Jerge-Tal is a village in Osh Region of Kyrgyzstan. It is part of the Alay District. Its population was 712 in 2021.

Nearby villages include Sopu-Korgon, Chiy-Talaa and Kichi-Karakol.

References

External links 
 Satellite map at Maplandia.com

Populated places in Osh Region